Joseph Jeremiah Chamberlain (May 10, 1910 – January 28, 1983) was a Major League Baseball shortstop and third baseman.

External links

1910 births
1983 deaths
Chicago White Sox players
Baseball players from San Francisco
Major League Baseball shortstops
Major League Baseball third basemen